AUIS may refer to:

American University of Integrative Sciences, a private, for-profit medical school located in Bridgetown, Barbados.
American University of Iraq, Sulaimani

See also

 AUI (disambiguation), for the singular of AUIs